Durk Derrick Banks (born October 19, 1992), known professionally as Lil Durk, is an American rapper, singer and songwriter. He is the lead member and founder of the collective and record label Only the Family (OTF). Durk garnered a cult following with the release of his Signed to the Streets mixtape series (2013–2014), which lead to a record deal with Def Jam Recordings. The label would release his debut studio albums, Remember My Name (2015) and Lil Durk 2X (2016), before Durk departed Def Jam in 2018.

Following the independent release of his Just Cause Y'all Waited mixtape in March 2018, Durk signed a deal with Alamo Records in July. In April 2020, Durk made his first appearance as a lead artist on the Billboard Hot 100 with the single "Viral Moment" off his fifth studio album, Just Cause Y'all Waited 2 (2020). Lil Durk's commercial resurgence continued with singles such as "3 Headed Goat" (featuring Polo G and Lil Baby), "Backdoor", and "The Voice"; his features on Drake's 2020 single, "Laugh Now Cry Later" and Pooh Shiesty's song, "Back in Blood"; as well as his LPs, The Voice (2020) and his joint album with Lil Baby, The Voice of the Heroes (2021)—which became his first release to debut atop the Billboard 200. His 2022 release 7220 became his second consecutive number one album.

Early life 
Born on October 19, 1992, in Englewood on the south side of Chicago, Illinois, Banks grew up with a great deal of responsibility at home, as his father was incarcerated when he was seven months old. He recalled that there were times when he did not have enough food at home when he was younger. He started his first breakthrough on social media channels like Myspace and YouTube, and grew fond of the idea of being a rapper as his online fan base started to expand. Banks took his career more seriously after becoming a father at 17, and dropping out of school at Paul Robeson High School in order to join the Black Disciples, a street gang in Chicago. Soon after joining, he began to get into trouble with the law, and served time in October 2011 due to gun charges, including possession of a firearm with a defaced serial number. He later pleaded guilty to a reduced charge of aggravated unauthorized use of a weapon, according to court records.

Career

Early career and rise to popularity 
In 2011, Durk started taking music seriously as a career. After plans to sign with Chief Keef and French Montana's labels fell through, he considered rapping as "a full-time career" after the releases of his two singles, "Sneak Dissin'" and "I'ma Hitta", each of which received generally positive feedback. On October 19, 2012, Durk released his third mixtape, Life Ain't No Joke. As of September 22, 2015, the mixtape has been downloaded over 216,000 times on DatPiff. In December 2012, Durk released the track, called "L's Anthem", which was remixed, featuring French Montana, as a re-release.

2013–2015: Signing to OTF and Def Jam Recordings and Signed to the Streets 

Due to the popularity of "L's Anthem" and its follow-up single, "Dis Ain't What U Want" in 2013, Durk accepted a joint venture deal with his collective Only the Family and Def Jam Recordings.

After a small number of delays, Durk's fourth mixtape Signed to the Streets was released on October 14, 2013, exclusively on DatPiff. It features two guest appearances from former Glo Gang affiliate Lil Reese, along with production credits from Paris Bueller and Young Chop, among others. Eight music videos were released to promote the mixtape: "Bars Pt. 2", "Oh My God", "100 Rounds", "Dis Ain't What U Want", "Bang Bros", "Traumatized", "Hittaz", and "Times". Signed to the Streets would later be named the eighth best mixtape of 2013 by Rolling Stone. On October 22, 2013, in an interview with XXL, Lil Durk said he was working on his debut album under Def Jam. In addition, Durk was named part of the 2014 XXL Freshmen Class.

On July 7, 2014, Durk released his fifth mixtape, Signed to the Streets 2.

2015–2016: Remember My Name and Lil Durk 2X 

On March 25, 2015, Durk announced the title of his debut studio album Remember My Name and revealed its original release date, May 12. On the same day, the album's first single, "Like Me", featuring Jeremih, was released. However, on April 20, 2015, Durk announced that the May 12 release date of Remember My Name was delayed; he also revealed the official album cover and announced that its release had been pushed back to June 2.

On June 2, 2015, Durk's debut album, Remember My Name, was released as planned. The album peaked at number fourteen on the Billboard 200 with 28,000 equivalent album units; it sold 24,000 copies in its first week, with the remainder of its unit count attributed to streaming activity and track sales. Later that year, Durk released his sixth mixtape, 300 Days, 300 Nights, on December 15, 2015. The only single released in promotion for the mixtape was "My Beyoncé", which features Detroit rapper Dej Loaf. The single was released on November 20, 2015. A music video for "My Beyoncé" had been released in early 2016. On June 5, 2017, the single was certified gold by the Recording Industry Association of America for single-equivalent units of over 500,000 copies.

Lil Durk released his second album, Lil Durk 2X, on July 22, 2016. Previously, he released the first single for the album, "She Just Wanna", featuring Ty Dolla $ign, in May. Other follow-up singles for the album include: "Money Walk", featuring Yo Gotti, and "True". The album failed to meet the same standards as his previous album, Remember My Name, peaking at number twenty-nine on the Billboard 200.

Later that November, Durk released his seventh mixtape, They Forgot. The mixtape features guest appearances from Lil Reese, Meek Mill, Mozzy, OTF Ikey, 21 Savage, Hypno Carlito, Dej Loaf, YFN Lucci, and BJ the Chicago Kid. While the production was handled by C-Sick, ChopSquad DJ, Donis Beats, DP Beats, LeekeLeek, Kid Wonder, London on da Track, TY Made It, and Young Chop. The mixtape was supported by the single "Baller". On December 7, 2016, Durk's single, "Like Me", from his debut studio album, Remember My Name, was certified gold by the RIAA.

2017–2019: Mixtapes, new label and albums 

Throughout 2017, Durk released several mixtapes: Love Songs for the Streets in February, Supa Vultures, a collaborative mixtape with Lil Reese, in August, Signed to the Streets 2.5 in October and Bloodas, a collaborative mixtape with Tee Grizzley, in December.

On March 29, 2018, Durk announced that his twelfth mixtape would be released the next day at midnight, and his first mixtape was to be released for digital retail, Just Cause Y'all Waited. That same time, he also confirmed that he fulfilled his contract with Def Jam Records. The following day, Durk, a free agent, released Just Cause Y'all Waited exclusively on Apple Music and the iTunes Store. Just Cause Y'all Waited had since been available for stream or download on other platforms. The mixtape has since become Durk's first non-album project to peak on a Billboard chart, charting at number fifty-seven on the Billboard 200, twenty-eight on the Top R&B/Hip-Hop Albums chart and twenty-two on the Rap Albums chart, respectively.

Durk has also announced a collaborative project with 808 Mafia producer DY, Durkio Krazy, which is yet to be released.

As of July 27, 2018, Durk announced that he signed to Alamo Records and Interscope Records, and released his third studio album Signed to the Streets 3 on November 9, 2018, under Alamo/Interscope. It features guest appearances from Young Dolph, Gunna, A Boogie wit da Hoodie, Future, Kevin Gates, Lil Baby, Lil Skies, TK Kravitz, and Ty Dolla Sign. Love Songs 4 the Streets 2, Lil Durk's fourth studio album, was released on August 2, 2019, serving as a sequel to his 2017 mixtape Love Songs 4 the Streets. It features guest appearances from 21 Savage, A Boogie wit da Hoodie, Key Glock, King Von, Meek Mill, and Nicki Minaj. The album peaked at number four on the Billboard 200 in the United States.

2020–present: Just Cause Y'all Waited 2, The Voice and 7220 

Durk's fifth album, Just Cause Y'all Waited 2, followed on May 8, 2020. The album contains his second highest-charting song, "3 Headed Goat", featuring Polo G and Lil Baby. It debuted at number five on the Billboard 200. A deluxe edition of the album was released on June 26, 2020, with seven additional tracks, helping the album climb to a new peak of number two on the Billboard 200.

On August 14, 2020, Lil Durk was featured on Canadian rapper Drake's single, "Laugh Now Cry Later". It debuted at number two on the Billboard Hot 100, becoming Banks' first top 40 and top 10 entry, and his highest-charting song.

On August 28, 2020, Lil Durk confirmed that a future project of his would be called "The Voice", which would eventually turn out to be the title track for his sixth studio album The Voice, first hinting at an October 2020 release. He initially stated he would release new music on the same day as rapper 6ix9ine's second studio album, TattleTales, amid their feud. The title track was released as the lead single from the album, along with the music video on September 4, 2020. He later released "Stay Down" with American singer 6lack and American rapper Young Thug as the second single, along with the video on October 30, 2020. Finally, he released "Backdoor" as the third and final single, along with the video on December 21, 2020. The album was eventually released on December 24, 2020. It is a tribute to his labelmate and late close friend, King Von, who is on the cover, and who was featured on the song, "Still Trappin".

Durk made a guest appearance on Kanye West's tenth studio album Donda, on the song "Jonah", which was released on August 29, 2021. Like with all other guest appearances on this album, Durk was also not acknowledged directly. He was also featured on Drake's sixth studio album Certified Lover Boy, on the song "In the Bible", which released on September 3, 2021.

On February 22, 2022, Lil Durk released a new single, "Ahhh Ha", produced by Southside. He initially stated that his seventh studio album, 7220, was due to be released on the same day, but it was pushed back to March 11; it was released then, consisting of 17 tracks, including guest appearances from Future, Gunna, Summer Walker, and Morgan Wallen.

On July 31, 2022, Durk announced that following an incident that occurred on July 30, where his head was struck by an explosive pyrotechnic, he will be suspending performing and recording to recover from his injuries. In the accident, which happened during his set at the  Lollapalooza music festival in Chicago, Durk suffered injuries to his face and right eye.

Only the Family 

Only the Family is a collective formed by Lil Durk in 2010. Artists such as the late King Von, Doodie Lo, Booka600, and OTF Ikey are associated with the label.

Personal life 
Throughout his childhood, his father, Dontay Banks Sr., had been serving two life sentences without the possibility of parole, with no disclosed details. He had an older brother, Dontay Banks Jr, who was known as DThang. , Durk has six children. He was engaged to his longtime girlfriend, India Royale. 

On May 31, 2014, Durk's cousin, rapper McArthur "OTF Nunu" Swindle, was murdered. Then, on March 27, 2015, Uchenna "OTF Chino Dolla" Agina, Durk's friend and manager, was also shot dead. On November 6, 2020, Lil Durk's close friend King Von was murdered in Atlanta. On June 6, 2021, Durk's brother, Dontay "DThang" Banks Jr, was shot and killed outside of a Chicago nightclub.

In the early hours of July 11, 2021, Durk was targeted in a home invasion, where he and his then girlfriend exchanged gunfire with the suspects. Nobody was harmed, and the suspects fled the scene.

Durk is Muslim. In his song, "Viral Moment", he says "I changed my life, I'm Muslim." In his verse on Drake's album "In the Bible", he says "I'm Muslim / I go by Quran". He is also seen wearing a kufi and thobe, and observing the Islamic prayer in the music video for his song, "Street Prayer".

Legal issues 
In 2011, Durk was arrested on a weapons charge and sentenced to three months in jail. He was later released on bond, only to be sent back to serve 87 more days. On June 5, 2013, Durk was arrested after allegedly throwing a loaded .40 caliber handgun into his car when police approached him on South Green Street in Chicago. He was charged with unlawful use of a weapon by a felon. He was held on $100,000 bond, and his lawyer would claim to have nine affidavits from witnesses who confirm Durk's innocence. One witness also admitted the gun was his. Durk was released on July 18, 2013.

On September 4, 2015, hours before a scheduled concert performance at the Theatre of Living Arts in Philadelphia, Pennsylvania, a shootout occurred, leaving Durk's tour bus damaged by gunfire, and one man dead during the scene. Durk was not arrested or questioned by police.

On August 19, 2016, Durk was cleared of disregarding probation when he was arrested on felony gun charges; the judge dropped the charges.

In June 2019, Lil Durk and King Von were arrested on attempted murder charges. According to prosecutors, the two men robbed and shot a man outside a popular Atlanta drive-in, for a Jeep Cherokee and $30,000, on February 5, 2019. After weeks in jail, Durk and Von were released on $250,000 & $300,000 bonds, respectively. In October 2022, the charges against Durk were dismissed.

Controversies 
Durk was involved in a rivalry between Chief Keef and rival Gangster Disciple Joseph "Lil Jojo" Coleman. After Durk released the song "Ls Anthem", in which dissed Jojo's gang set, The Brick Squad (not to be confused with rapper Gucci Mane's label), Jojo responded with the diss track, "BDK (300K)", calling out a vast majority of gang members, most namely Keef, Lil Reese, and Durk. The feud ended in tragedy, after Lil Jojo was shot and killed on September 4, 2012.

After signing, respectively, with Universal Music's sister labels, Def Jam Recordings and Interscope Records, social and personal problems between Durk and Chief Keef's label, Glo Gang, began to develop in late 2012. After a social media exchange, Durk disassociated himself from Keef's label. Then, a spawn of diss songs followed, even for Durk in particular, his remix to Nicki Minaj's "Chiraq" with Meek Mill and Shy Glizzy. There, he not only calls out Keef, but also mentions Lil Reese, The Game, Tyga, King L, and the Gangster Disciples. He even calls Keef "disrespectful" for turning his back on their friendship for Tyga and The Game's own remix of "Chiraq". In the midst of Keef's then-ongoing beef with rap group Migos, Durk shouted out the group in support to humiliate Keef. However, in August 2014, Durk decided to mend his differences with him, and just squash the feud.

After Durk dissed King L on his "Chiraq" remix, L would respond to both him and Keef, calling their feud a "whack movie trailer" comparison. However, this ended up short-lived, as King L called his debacle with Durk, "a big mistake".

Durk's feud with California rappers The Game and Tyga ignited in 2014, after releasing their remix to Nicki Minaj's "Chiraq", called "Chiraq to L.A.". This both urged Durk and The Game to respond by heated exchanges socially. After Durk threatened to "holla" at Tyga, he went to sexually boast about having an affair with Game's ex-fiancée, Tiffney Cambridge. However, this would force Game to respond with "Bigger than Me", which he targets Durk, 40 Glocc, 2014 XXL's Freshman Class, and many countless others. Just eight months following, Durk squashed his feuds with Game, and a week later with Tyga.

In his adolescence, Durk and Famous Dex attended Paul Robeson High School, but after they both dropped out, the two seemingly lost contact. After Durk became famous, Dex immediately revealed in an interview that he never saw him in his later days soon after, until they finally got a chance to meet with one another during the 2016 BET Awards. Durk also admitted that he was still "rockin'" with Dex.

In the spring of 2016, after Tay600 was accused of testifying against fellow Black Disciples RondoNumbaNine, CDai, and DRose 600 in their murder trials as an eyewitness, he was kicked out of his gang set, The Team 600, and was also dropped from Only the Family. However, Tay600 denied "snitching" on his former friends, and blamed the entire ordeal on Durk, as he responded with a music video for his song, "Pressure", as well as a mixtape, The Truth, released that February. After dissing Tay600 at a live venue, Durk also released a remix to Meek Mill's "We Ball" with Tay's cousin, Booka600. Infuriated of the fact that his ex-friend collaborated with a rival, Tay600 responded with his own remix of "We Ball", calling Durk's collective Only the Family "fags". The feud resurfaced later in September 2017, after Tay600 criticized his former gang members for not helping him. He also bragged that he was involved in an affair with the mother of two of Durk's six children.

Discography 

 Studio albums
 Remember My Name (2015)
 Lil Durk 2X (2016)
 Signed to the Streets 3 (2018)
 Love Songs 4 the Streets 2 (2019)
 Just Cause Y'all Waited 2 (2020)
 The Voice (2020)
 7220 (2022)

 Collaborative albums
 The Voice of the Heroes (with Lil Baby) (2021)

Awards and nominations

References

External links 
 
 
 
 
 
 

1992 births
Living people
African-American male rappers
Def Jam Recordings artists
Drill musicians
Trap musicians
Gangsta rappers
Midwest hip hop musicians
Rappers from Chicago
Singers from Chicago
Songwriters from Illinois
21st-century American rappers
American hip hop singers
Interscope Records artists
Sony Music artists
African-American Muslims
21st-century African-American male singers
African-American male singer-songwriters
Converts to Islam from Christianity